Contents : A B C D E F G H I J K L M N O P Q R S T U V W X Y Z By League'''


The oldest rugby club in France is Le Havre AC, founded in 1872 making it the oldest association football and rugby club registered in France.

Presentation of the lists
There are two lists of the clubs playing in the French rugby union system in the following levels:
 Top 14
 Rugby Pro D2
Some other clubs are listed (only if they have a dedicated article) :
 Fédérale 1 clubs
 Fédérale 2 clubs
 Fédérale 3 clubs
 Honor
 Honor Promotion
 First series
 Second series
 Third series
 Fourth series

The first list displays the clubs sorted by name of the town where they are located
 Club: short name of the club, with a [+] if a dedicated category exists for the club
 Full name: official name of the club (using English capitalization rules)
 Town: name of the town where or near the club is located, followed by the French department
 Status of the club: league in which the club currently plays

The second list displays the clubs sorted by league.

A

B

C

D

E

F

G

H

I

J

K

L

M

N

O

P

Q

R

S

T

U

V

W

X

Y

Z

By League

Notes

References

 
clubs
rugby union